Karin Wirz (born 26 September 1963) is a former German female canoeist who won at senior level the Wildwater Canoeing World Championships.

References

External links
 Karin Wirz at Munzinger

1963 births
Living people
German female canoeists
Place of birth missing (living people)